This is a list of the winners and nominees of the Primetime Emmy Award for Outstanding Directing for a Limited or Anthology Series or Movie.

Chronology of category names
Over the years, the scope of this award has evolved and the name with which it has been presented reflects those changes:

 1975: Director of the Year – Special
 1976: Outstanding Directing in a Special Program – Drama or Comedy
 1977: Outstanding Directing in a Special Program
 1978–1979: Outstanding Directing in a Special Program – Drama or Comedy
 1980–1986: Outstanding Directing in a Limited Series or Special
 1987–1992: Outstanding Directing in a Miniseries or Special
 1993–1996: Outstanding Individual Achievement in Directing for a Miniseries or Special
 1997–1998: Outstanding Directing for a Miniseries or Special
 1999–2000: Outstanding Directing for a Miniseries or Movie
 2001–2002: Outstanding Directing for a Miniseries, Movie, or Special
 2003–2015: Outstanding Directing for a Miniseries, Movie, or Dramatic Special
 2016–2020: Outstanding Directing for a Limited Series, Movie, or Dramatic Special
 2021–present: Outstanding Directing for a Limited or Anthology Series or Movie

Winners and nominations

1970s

1980s

1990s

2000s

2010s

2020s

Total awards by network

 HBO – 17
 CBS – 8
 NBC – 8
 ABC – 7
 PBS – 4
 TNT – 3
 FX – 2 
 Netflix – 2
 AMC – 1

Directors with multiple wins

4 wins
 John Frankenheimer (3 consecutive)
 Joseph Sargent

2 wins
 Marvin J. Chomsky
 Lamont Johnson
 Mike Nichols
 Daniel Petrie (consecutive)
 Jay Roach

Directors with multiple nominations

9 nominations
 Lamont Johnson
 Joseph Sargent

6 nominations
 Glenn Jordan
 Daniel Petrie

5 nominations
 John Erman
 John Frankenheimer
 Ryan Murphy

4 nominations
 Paul Bogart
 Tom Gries

3 nominations
 Jeff Bleckner
 Gilbert Cates
 Marvin J. Chomsky
 Fielder Cook
 Stephen Frears
 Tom Hooper
 Mick Jackson
 Richard Loncraine
 Sam Miller
 Frank Pierson
 Jay Roach

2 nominations
 Robert Allan Ackerman
 Lou Antonio
 Bob Balaban
 Dan Curtis
 Scott Frank
 James Goldstone
 David Greene
 Tom Hanks
 Robert Harmon
 Noah Hawley
 Andrei Konchalovsky
 John Korty
 Buzz Kulik
 Barry Levinson
 Delbert Mann
 Philip Martin
 Mike Nichols
 David Nutter
 Anthony Page
 Mark Rydell
 Boris Sagal
 Mikael Salomon
 George Schaefer
 Charles Sturridge
 Betty Thomas
 Peter Werner
 Susanna White

Programs with multiple nominations

4 nominations
 American Crime Story
 Fargo

3 nominations
 Watchmen

2 nominations
 American Horror Story
 Fosse/Verdon
 I May Destroy You
 The Night Of
 The Pacific
 Prime Suspect
 Sherlock

References

Directing for a Miniseries, Movie, or Dramatic Special